The Serbian Civil Code (SCC for short) was the first and only complete Civil Code in Serbia. It was enacted on the 25th of March 1844, modeled mostly after the Civil Code of Austria, during the reign of the Defenders of the Constitution and Prince Aleksandar Karađorđević.

Its author is Jovan Hadžić. The initial title of the Serbian Civil Code was „Zakonik građanski(j) za Knjažestvo Srbiju“. 

It consists of 950 articles in total, which makes it one of the shortest Civil Codes created. 

The Serbian Civil Code is one of the earliest and most important modern Civil law codifications enacted in Europe during the 19th century, after Napoleon’s Code Civile (1804), the Civil Code of Austria, and the Code of Netherlands (1838). 

It was in force for a whole century, until 1946, which makes it the longest-lasting code in Serbia’s recent history. By the Law on the invalidity of pre-war legislation and those enacted during the enemy occupation, dated 1946, its use was enabled until the new legislation was adapted. This means that the Serbian Civil Code is applied to this day when it comes to certain legal lacunae.

The enactment of the Code.

The Serbian Civil Code was enacted because of the Principality Serbia’s need to establish a stable public order, provide legal certainty as well as the need to manage the property law-related relations, as they became complex after the enactment of hatt-i sharif(s) from 1830. and 1833. It was necessary to establish laws that would support the inviolability of private property.

It took a significant amount of time for the Code to be enacted because of the absence of certain conditions, including the nation’s general illiteracy, the absence of developed legal theory, and the state of legislative and judicial practice.

Although reluctant regarding the idea, due to the significant dissatisfaction of the people, as well as the newly formed situation in the Principality, Prince Miloš Obrenović, during the spring of 1829, named members of the legislative committee, with its mission being to form a Civil law Code. Members of the mentioned committee, as well as the ones established afterward, were prominent and educated people of their time, although they didn't possess any legal education. Among the mentioned members were Georgije Zaharijades, teacher of Prince Miloš's own sons, to whom the Prince assigned translating a part of the Code civile from German, as well as Vuk Stefanović Karadžić, Dimitrije Davidović, and others. The committee’s work focused on translating foreign laws, whose content didn’t match contemporary Serbia’s situation and needs. Afterward, the work on the Code temporarily ceased. It was continued in 1834 but to no avail. Due to the lack of the required expertise, no committee managed to fulfill the Prince’s expectations. The task was even avoided and taken involuntarily, as the committee members were aware of their lack of expertise which was required for the undertaking in question.
Afterward, Prince Miloš entrusted the creation of the Code to a respectable lawyer and writer Jovan Hadžić, and the mayor of Zemun, Vasilije Lazarević.

At the Prince’s behest, they were assigned with forming a short compilation of civil law, modeled like the Civil Code of Austria, based on Serbian customary law that would be clear and comprehensible for everyone. Arriving in Serbia in 1873, Jovan Hadžić and Lazarević shared the workload, therefore Jovan Hadžić was supposed to create a Civil Code, whilst Lazarević worked on criminal and procedural law Codes. The two of them, as soon as they arrived in Serbia, looked through the material relevant to the Code so far and created a report for the Prince. They pointed out the inconsistent understanding of property, as well as the injustice when it comes to omitting female children from the hereditary order. However, Lazarević passed away shortly after so Jovan Hadžić was forced to take on his part of the workload as well.

Due to his active participation in constitution-related battles, Jovan Hadžić ceased his work on the Code, which he continued after Prince Miloš abdicated the throne and the mentioned battles were over. Jovan Hadžić's draft was inspected by the committee formed alongside Council, and, after some slight modifications, it was authorized by Prince Aleksandar and the State Council. The Code was proclaimed in 1844, on the Blagovesti holiday. Although enacted on the Prince Miloš’s initiative, this Code was forced by the Principality’s people, as they were dissatisfied with Miloš’s self-will. 

Shortly after its enactment, the Serbian Civil Code was harshly criticized and impugned. The comments and attitudes of most of its critics were negative and some of them were even disparaging. Some of the critics considered Jovan Hadžić a copyist, which is not accurate considering that an undertaking like this would require a notable law education, as well as reasoning, considering it was hard to adapt legal norms to the underdeveloped legal terminology in Serbia. The Civil Code of Austria is more developed and older in comparison to the Serbian Civil Code, and SCC is also less developed when compared to Montenegro’s „Opšti imovinski zakonik“ from 1888, which was composed by Valtazar Bogišić.

Among the first critics of the Code were Pavle Šeroglić, a Serbian lawyer from Hungary, Dimitrije Matić, a respectable law professor, Gligorije Giga Geršić, and the first serious remark came from Nikola Krstić, who influenced the Department of Justice enough for them to commence a revision procedure of the Code in 1872. Although Krstić presented a draft of a new Civil Code, State Council decided that some modifications and additions to Jovan Hadžić's Code would suffice.

During the end of the 19. and at the beginning of the 20. century was the harshest criticism wave, leaving behind a significant impact. He was criticized by the most eminent Serbian lawyers – Andra Đorđević and professor Dragoljub Aranđelović, who was the one to translate the Civil Code of Austria into the Serbian language. Dragoljub Aranđelović harshly criticized Jovan Hadžić and his work, stating that there has never been a worse Code enacted in Serbian history. Professor Aranđelović commenced an initiative for bringing a new Civil Code. 
Critics were made by Živojin Perić as well, who advocated for a new codification. Perić, as well as Slobodan Jovanović, pointed out that the Serbian Civil Code was a shortened version of the Civil Code of Austria.

All of them were of opinion that this Code does not suit the needs of the Serbian people, as well as the foregoing situation in Serbia. Critics of Jovan Hadžić and his Code remain to this day. Most objections state that he contributed to the decomposition of the family cooperative, denied heritage rights of the daughter, limited women’s business ability, etc. He was criticized for neglecting folk traditions. The critics pointed out that the Serbian Civil Code was a copy and shortened version of the Civil Code of Austria from 1811, after which it was modeled.

The Serbian Civil Code was surpassed 60ish years after its enactment due to the newly formed situation in the country and its society’s development, as well as the advent of new and modern Civil codifications across the world.

History 
Serbian Civil Code is only the third European codification of civil law after France's Code Napoléon (1804) and the Civil Code of Austria (1811), all adapted and based on Justinian I's legal system. It was originally known as the 1844 Civil Code of the Kingdom of Serbia. It regulated, among other things, the issues of private property, personal freedom, freedom of contracting, and the equality of parties in civil proceedings.

The Code was written by the first president of the Matica Srpska, lawyer and writer Jovan Hadžić at the behest of Prince Miloš Obrenović, and it was based on the model of the Austrian and French codifications of civil law and the earliest judicial reforms by Justinian, particularly through the complete revision of all Roman laws, something that had never before been done. The total of Justinian's legislature is known today as the Corpus Juris Civilis. The 1844 Civil Code, written by Hadžić, was designed to protect owners of land. Hadžić was a true innovator for he envisaged success of the civil procedural law, that is of judicial system.

Hadžić's code contained basic elements of civil understanding of institute of property and trading of property, that is contracts. Property and property transfer/trading were possible only if the judicial protection existed, and that protection was guaranteed under the 1840 Law of Arrangement of District Courts and after the Supreme Court came into being in 1846.

In 1837, under pressure from the Russians and the Constitutionalist oligarchy to provide a constitution, Miloš Obrenović appointed the best Serbian judicial minds at the time, Jovan Hadžić, and one of the most influential lawyers in Austria, to draw up a draft to be submitted to a committee. Hadžić's Serbian Civil code is based on the Civil Code of Austria in abbreviated form, of course, with an introduction of the institution of Saint Sava`s Serbian Zakonopravilo and customary law. Hadžić drafted the Serbian Civil Code, which was accepted by the legislative committee and promulgated the code on the 25th of March 1844.

Changes 
The rules of this Code were in use for many years after it went out of effect in 1946, until the adoption of separate laws for individual fields of civil law (such as inheritance in 1955, torts and contracts in 1978 and property legal relations in 1980).

References

See 
 Jovan Hadžić

Law of Serbia